The Nationalist Workers Party may refer to one of several political groups:

 The Fascist Nationalist Workers Party of New Zealand (formerly New Force)
 The Nationalist Workers Party (MDP) of Turkey who polled 2.93% in the 1987 Turkish general election
 The original name of the New Triumph Party of Argentina, a minor far right Neo-Nazi group.